Koroko Forest( in arabic :غابة كوروكو)is a forest full of trees and plants loving the wet areas in the north of the Kingdom of Morocco and overlooks the Mediterranean Sea. The Koroko Highlands region is an ecological and biological site, covering an area of about 5,400 hectares, of which 1,800 hectares are densely forested.

The Koroko forest belongs to the province of Nador and contains important animal populations, the most important of which are the Barbary macaque and the wild boar. And many types of trees such as green pine, cypress, eucalyptus, oak and thuya, covering a surface of 5,200 hectares.

References

Forests of Morocco
Nador Province